Prostilifer is a genus of very small ectoparasitic sea snails, marine gastropod mollusks or micromollusks in the family Eulimidae.

Distribution
This marine genus is endemic to Australia and occurs off Queensland.

Species
Species within the genera Prostilifer include:
 Prostilifer subpellucida (Pease, 1865)

References

 Warén A. (1980) Descriptions of new taxa of Eulimidae (Mollusca, Prosobranchia), with notes on some previously described genera. Zoologica Scripta 9: 283-306

Eulimidae